WSDI-LD, virtual and UHF digital channel 32, is a low-powered Novelisima-affiliated television station licensed to Indianapolis, Indiana, United States. The station is owned by HC2 Holdings.

History 
The station's construction permit was initially issued on February 22, 2011, under the calls of W30DI-D. The current WSDI-LD calls were assigned on February 8, 2017.

The station identification placard presently in use on-air denotes Indianapolis.

The station was formerly affiliated with Quest until December 2019, when NBC affiliate WTHR (channel 13) carried Quest on its fifth digital subchannel.

Digital channels

Former Affiliations
30.1 - Quest (2017-2019)
30.1 - OnTV4U (2019-2021)
30.1 - Novelisima (2021-2022)
30.2 - Decades (TV network) ( -2023)
30.3 - Tuff TV (2017-2018)
30.3 - Buzzr (2019-2021)
30.4 - AccuWeather (2017-2018)
30.4 - CBN News Channel (2018-2022)
30.5 - RevFrontier (Infomercials)(2017-2018)
30.5 - CBN News (2018-2019)
30.6 - Stadium (2017-2022)
30.6 - TBD (2022)

References

External links
DTV America

Info for WSDI-LD
RabbitEars WSDI-LD

Low-power television stations in the United States
Innovate Corp.
Spanish-language television stations in Indiana
WSDI-LD
Television channels and stations established in 2014
2014 establishments in Indiana